The  is a curling club in Tokoro Town, Kitami City, Hokkaido Island, Japan. The club has about 40 teams, including a team .

Background
Hokkaido Island, Japan and Alberta, Canada became sister province in 1980.
Then, curling was introduced to Tokoro Town as an outdoor recreation while farmers could not work in winter, and has been popular sport among people in Tokoro.
In 1981, lessons are held by former world champion curler Wally Ursuliak.
But major sponsor does not exist in Tokoro because it is a small local town. As the result, famous curlers born in Tokoro has gone to other prefectures in Japan.

Loco Solare

The team is based in, and all the members are from Kitami City. The team got bronze medals at PyeongChang 2018 Winter Olympics.

History
Mari Motohashi, who was an Olympian at Torino 2006 and at Vancouver 2010 as a member of Team Aomori,
had also been one of such curlers. She thought why curlers born in Tokoro could not stay in the town. In the Summer of 2010, she asked two former curlers once retired, Megumi Mabuchi and Akane Eda, and two student curlers Yurika Yoshida
and Yumi Suzuki,
to join her rink named "Loco Solare," also known as "LS Kitami."
At the press conference in Tokyo on 16 August 2010, she announced leaving Japanese national representative Team Aomori to establish her own rink in Tokoro. It was hard to find big sponsor in Kitami City, but small ones increased slowly. But in September 2013, Eda left the team because she could not kept the balance of curling and her work pastry chef.

In June 2014, Sochi 2014 Olympian as alternate; Chinami Yoshida
joined the team.
In the season of 2014–15, the team got their first winning prize at the World Curling Tour event; Avonair Cash Spiel. In May 2015, Satsuki Fujisawa
joined the team.
After Fujisawa became the member, Mabuchi retired from games, but the team got medals as Japanese representative in various tournaments every year. In 2015, while Motohashi had maternity leave,
Kotomi Ishizaki appeared at Pacific-Asia Championships as alternate.

Olympics
In September 2017, this amateur team won the five set match at 2017 Japanese Olympic Curling Trials against team Chiaki Matsumura.
At PyeongChang 2018, the team got bronze medals.

Members

Team

Grand Slam record

Former events

Other notable WCT record
World Curling Tour records other than Grand Slam.

References

External links
, a.k.a. : Official site (Google Translate)
Facebook: Team LocoSolare (Google Translate)
NPO, : Official site (Google Translate, Nonprofit organization)
Advics Tokoro Curling Hall: Official site (Public curling hall owned by Ktami City)
2016 Swift Current WCC's introductory PDF (pages 1, 15)
Team Satsuki Fujisawa – Grand Slam of Curling

Curling in Japan
Curling clubs established in 2010
2010 establishments in Japan